Following are lists of members of the Western Australian Legislative Assembly: